Duchess Dorothea Sophia of Saxe-Altenburg (19 December 1587 – 10 February 1645) was Princess-Abbess of Quedlinburg.

She was the fourth child and second daughter of Friedrich Wilhelm I, Duke of Saxe-Weimar, and his first wife, Sophie of Württemberg.

Reign 

On 21 April 1618, Dorothea Sophia was elected successor to Princess-Abbess Dorothea. Her election was approved by Matthias, Holy Roman Emperor.

During her reign, Quedlinburg was devastated by the Thirty Years' War. Unlike her predecessors, Princess-Abbess Dorothea Sophia often confronted John George I, Elector of Saxony.

Religious policy
Dorothea Sophia prohibited her clergy to deny absolution to a person who made a genuine and contrite confession. However, if the same parishioner repeated the sin, they were to face increasingly severe chastisement and, finally, a referral to the consistory. She proscribed that these parishioners would not be able to serve as godparents, nor be buried according to tradition or within consecrated ground. These decisions were a lot like the previous Catholic practice. She also took measures to prevent secret engagements, declaring that every engagement has to be witnessed by three men and publicly announced.

Ancestry

References

External links 

|-

1587 births
1645 deaths
Abbesses of Quedlinburg
Lutheran abbesses
House of Wettin
Daughters of monarchs